In Germanic mythology, Wayland the Smith (Old Frisian: Wela(n)du; ; ; Galans (Galant) in Old French;  from , lit. "crafting one") is a master blacksmith originating in Germanic heroic legend, described by Jessie Weston as "the weird and malicious craftsman, Weyland".

Wayland's story is most clearly told in the Old Norse sources Völundarkviða (a poem in the Poetic Edda) and Þiðreks saga. In them, Wayland is a smith who is enslaved by a king. Wayland takes revenge by killing the king's sons and then escapes by crafting a winged cloak and flying away. A number of other visual and textual sources clearly allude to similar stories, most prominently the Old English poem Deor and the Franks Casket.

Wayland is also mentioned in passing in a wide range of texts, such as the Old English Waldere and Beowulf, as the maker of weapons and armour. He is mentioned in the German poems about Theoderic the Great as the father of Witige. He is also attributed to have made various swords for Charlemagne and his paladins, namely Curtana, Durendal and Joyeuse.

Attestations

Earliest evidence

The oldest reference known to Wayland the Smith is possibly a gold solidus with a Frisian runic inscription ᚹᛖᛚᚩᛞᚢ wela[n]du 'wayland'. It is not certain whether the coin depicts the legendary smith or bears the name of a moneyer who happened to be called Wayland (perhaps because he had taken the name of the legendary smith as an epithet). The coin was found near Schweindorf, in the region Ostfriesland in north-west Germany, and is dated AD 575–625.

Scandinavian

Visual
Wayland's legend is depicted on Ardre image stone VIII, and probably on a tenth-century copper mount found in Uppåkra in 2011. A number of other possible visual representations exist in early medieval Scandinavia, but are harder to verify as they do not contain enough distinctive features corresponding to the story of Wayland found in textual sources.

Völundarkviða
According to Völundarkviða, the king of the Finns (the Old Norse term for the Saami people) had three sons: Völundr (Wayland) and his two brothers Egil and Slagfiðr. In one version of the myth, the three brothers lived with three Valkyries: Ölrún, Hervör alvitr and Hlaðguðr svanhvít. After nine years, the Valkyries left their lovers. Egil and Slagfiðr followed, never to return. In another version, Völundr married the swan maiden Hervör, and they had a son, Heime, but Hervör later left Völundr. In both versions, his love left him with a ring. In the former myth, he forged seven hundred duplicates of this ring.

Later, King Niðhad captured Völundr in his sleep in Nerike and ordered him hamstrung and imprisoned on the island of Sævarstöð. There Völundr was forced to forge items for the king. Völundr's wife's ring was given to the king's daughter, Böðvildr. Niðhad wore Völundr's sword.

In revenge, Völundr killed the king's sons when they visited him in secret, and fashioned goblets from their skulls, jewels from their eyes, and a brooch from their teeth. He sent the goblets to the king, the jewels to the queen and the brooch to the king's daughter. When Böðvild takes her ring to Völundr for mending, he tricks and seduces her, and gets her pregnant. Later, he flies to Niðhad's hall where he explains how he has murdered the king's sons, fashioned jewelry from their bodies and fathered a child with Böðvild. The crying king laments that his archers and horsemen can't reach Völundr, as the smith flies away never to be seen again. Niðhad summons his daughter, asking her if Völundr's story was true. The poem ends with Böðvild stating that she was unable to protect herself from Völundr as he was too strong for her.

Þiðreks saga

Þiðreks saga also includes a version of the story of Wayland. This part of the saga is sometimes called Velents þáttr smiðs.

The events described at King Niðung's court (identifiable with Niðhad in the Eddic lay) broadly follow the version in the Poetic Edda (though in the saga his brother, Egil the archer, is present to help him to make his wings and to help Velent escape). However, the rest of the story is different. It tells of how Wayland was the son of a giant named Wade, and how he was taught to smith by two dwarfs. It also tells of how he came to be with King Nidung, crossing the sea in a hollow log, and how he forged the sword Mimung as part of a bet with the king's smith. And it also tells about the argument that led to Nidung's hamstringing of Wayland, and ultimately to Wayland's revenge: Nidung had promised to give Wayland his daughter in marriage and also half his kingdom, and then went back on this promise.

The saga elaborates on the flying contraption he builds using feathers collected by Egil; the contraption was called the flygil which suggests it was a pair of wings in the original German version, but conceived of as a fjaðrhamr (feather cloak) by the saga-writers. Wayland here also wears a blood-filled bladder as a prop, instructing Egil to aim his arrow at this bag, thus feigning injury and deceiving the king.

The saga also tells of the birth of a son, Wideke, to Wayland and Nidung's daughter. While he was still in captivity, the couple have a conversation, and they vow each other's love; the smith also reveals he has fashioned a weapon and hidden it in the forge for his unborn son. He settles in his native Sjoland and eventually marries the princess with the blessing of her brother who became the next king after Niðung's death.

This son inherits the sword Mimung, and goes on to become one of Thidrek/Didrik's warriors.

Other
In Icelandic manuscripts from the fourteenth century onwards, the terms Labyrinth and Domus Daedali ('home of Daedalus') are rendered Vǫlundarhús ('house of Vǫlundr'). This shows that Völundr was seen as equivalent to, or even identical with, the classical hero Daedalus.

In Þorsteins saga Víkingssonar, Völundr is the manufacturer of the magic sword Gram (also named Balmung and Nothung) and the magic ring that Þorsteinn retrieves.

English

Visual

The Franks Casket is one of a number of other early English references to Wayland, whose story was evidently well known and popular, although no extended version in Old English has survived. In the front panel of the Franks Casket, incongruously paired with an Adoration of the Magi, Wayland stands at the extreme left in the forge where he is held as a slave by King Niðhad, who has had his hamstrings cut to hobble him. Below the forge is the headless body of Niðhad's son, whom Wayland has killed, making a goblet from his skull; his head is probably the object held in the tongs in Wayland's hand. With his other hand Wayland offers the goblet to Böðvildr, Niðhad's daughter. Another female figure is shown in the centre; perhaps Wayland's helper, brother Egil, or Böðvildr again. To the right of the scene his brother) catches birds, which he then makes wings from with their feathers, so he is able to escape.

During the Viking Age in northern England, Wayland is depicted in his smithy, surrounded by his tools, at Halton, Lancashire, and fleeing from his royal captor by clinging to a flying bird, on crosses at Leeds, West Yorkshire, and at Sherburn-in-Elmet and Bedale, both in North Yorkshire.

English local tradition placed Wayland's forge in a Neolithic long barrow mound known as Wayland's Smithy, close to the Uffington White Horse in Oxfordshire. If a horse to be shod, or any broken tool, were left with a sixpenny piece at the entrance of the barrow the repairs would be executed.

Textual

The Old English poem Deor, which recounts the famous sufferings of various figures before turning to those of Deor, its author, begins with "Welund":
Welund tasted misery among snakes.
The stout-hearted hero endured troubles
had sorrow and longing as his companions
cruelty cold as winter - he often found woe
Once Nithad laid restraints on him,
supple sinew-bonds on the better man.
That went by; so can this.

To Beadohilde, her brothers' death was not
so painful to her heart as her own problem
which she had readily perceived
that she was pregnant; nor could she ever
foresee without fear how things would turn out.
That went by, so can this.

Weland had fashioned the mail shirt worn by Beowulf according to lines 450–455 of the epic poem of the same name:
No need then
to lament for long or lay out my body.
If the battle takes me, send back
this breast-webbing that Weland fashioned
and Hrethel gave me, to Lord Hygelac.
Fate goes ever as fate must.
 (Heaney trans.)

The reference in Waldere is similar to that in Beowulf – the hero's sword was made by Weland – while Alfred the Great in his translation of Boethius asks plaintively: "What now are the bones of Wayland, the goldsmith preeminently wise?"

Swords fashioned by Wayland are regular properties of medieval romance. King Rhydderch Hael gave one to Merlin, and Rimenhild made a similar gift to Child Horn. English literature was also aware of the character Wade, whose name is similar to that of Vaði, the father of Wayland in Þiðreks saga.

Continental Germanic
Wayland is known by the name Wieland in line 965 of the Latin epic Waltharius, a literary composition based on Old High German oral tradition, as the smith who made the poem's eponymous protagonist's armor:

Toponyms and folklore

Wayland is associated with Wayland's Smithy, a burial mound in the Berkshire Downs. This was named by the English, but the megalithic mound significantly predates them. It is from this association that the folk belief came about that a horse left there overnight with a small silver coin (groat) would be shod by morning. 

This belief is mentioned in the first episode of Puck of Pook's Hill by Rudyard Kipling, "Weland's Sword", which narrates the rise and fall of the god.

In modern culture
Sir Walter Scott includes Wayland Smith as a character in his novel Kenilworth set in 1575.

Both the Austrian composer Siegmund von Hausegger (1904) and the Russian composer Leopold van der Pals (1913) used the Wayland saga as inspiration for symphonic poems.

See also

References
Citations

Bibliography

External links

 Völundarkviða - Heimskringla.no

Characters in Norse mythology
English legendary characters
Germanic gods
Germanic legends
Legendary Norsemen
Smithing gods
Swordsmiths
Swan maidens